The Diplomatic Telecommunications Service (DTS) is a system of integrated telecommunications networks that supports foreign affairs agencies in Washington, D.C., and U.S. diplomatic missions abroad. It is administered by the United States Department of State Diplomatic Telecommunications Service Program Office (DTSPO). DTS is a global network of telecommunications sites that is charged with providing a global, reliable, and cost-effective communications network for the U.S. foreign affairs community.

Relay locations
 Beltsville Messaging Center, Beltsville, Maryland
 Brandy Station, Warrenton Training Center, Virginia
 Network Access Point (NAP) of the Americas, Miami, Florida
 United States Embassy, Annex A, RAF Croughton, United Kingdom
 European Communication Research Center, Egelsbach, Germany
 Opana Radar Site, Hawaii
 Naval Air Station Sigonella, Italy

References

External links
 Diplomatic Telecommunications Service Program Office

United States Department of State
Secret broadcasting